Warne is a river of Lower Saxony, Germany.

The Warne springs west of Liebenburg. It is a left tributary of the Oker at Dorstadt.

See also
List of rivers of Lower Saxony

References

Rivers of Lower Saxony
Rivers of Germany